The Rock Creek Railway was one of the first electric streetcar companies in Washington, D.C., and the first to extend into Maryland. It was incorporated in 1888, started operations in 1890, and by 1892 ran some five miles from the Cardoza/Shaw neighborhood of D.C. to Chevy Chase Lake, Maryland.  On September 21, 1895, Rock Creek Railway purchased the Washington and Georgetown Railroad Company and the two formed the Capital Traction Company.

History
The Rock Creek Railway was founded by Francis Newlands as part of a plan to develop streetcar suburbs in northwestern D.C. and adjacent Maryland. He and his partners incorporated the company on June 23, 1888, four days after the Eckington and Soldiers' Home Electric Railway. In 1890, service began on Florida Avenue between Connecticut Avenue NW and 18th Street NW. The company built an iron bridge across Rock Creek at Cincinnati Street NW (now Calvert Street NW), which was completed on July 21, 1891. On September 16, 1892, the line was extended up 18th Street to the neighborhood now known as Adams Morgan, across the Cincinnati Street Bridge and northward on Connecticut Avenue NW all the way to the District Line. The company also acquired trackage built by Newlands' Chevy Chase Land Company, extending the line to Chevy Chase Lake, Maryland. Along the way it connected to the Metropolitan Railroad's Connecticut Avenue Line, and to the power house at the crossing of the Georgetown Branch of the Baltimore and Ohio Railroad in Chevy Chase. Power was supplied by an overhead trolley wire.

Extensions east on Florida Avenue to North Capitol Street, and north to the National Zoo, were authorized on April 30, 1892, but never built.

On March 2, 1893, a line was added east along U Street NW through Shaw to 7th Street NW, intersecting with several downtown lines and making Adams Morgan more readily accessible from downtown.  This line used the Love Electric Traction Company's system of conduit electrification. Cars changed between the Rock Creek Railway and the Metropolitan Railroad at U and 18th Streets.

On March 1, 1895, Congress authorized the Rock Creek Railway to purchase the Washington and Georgetown as part of an attempt to consolidate the streetcar system. On September 21, 1895, the two formed the Capital Traction Company, the first company created during "the great streetcar consolidation." In that same year, the Kensington Railway started operation from the terminus of the old Rock Creek Railway. It continued down Connecticut Avenue and Kensington Parkway to a stop near the B&O Railroad station and then to Norris Station in 1916. In 1923, Capital Traction began running its cars down the Kensington track.

In 1935, Capital Traction was given permission to replace the streetcar all the way to Kensington with buses. The last streetcars ran on September 15 of that year.  The trolley poles, safety domes, and most of the waiting stations were removed in the following week. The tracks remained for several years, but when the Export Control Act was passed barring the sale of most scrap metal to Japan it had a loophole for old rails, which made Rock Creek rail very lucrative. At that point the tracks in Maryland were pulled up and sold to Japan by the state of Maryland. It's likely the tracks were melted down for use in the Japanese war effort.In 1980, the Chevy Chase Lake waiting station at the northern end of the line was disassembled and moved to Hyattstown, Maryland.

Notes

Street railways in Washington, D.C.
Defunct Washington, D.C., railroads
Rock Creek (Potomac River tributary)